is a 2011 Japanese historical martial arts film directed by Seiji Chiba and starring Rina Takeda.

Plot
Rina Takeda plays the role of a female ninja named Kisaragi who attempts to rescue a group of women being held captive to become toys for men. The film is set sometime in the Sengoku period, during a time of fierce fighting between the Koga and Iga ninja clans.

Cast
Rina Takeda as Kisaragi
Mayu Onomura as Hatsu Kagetsu
Shiho Fujisawa as Inharu
Kotono as Yayoi
Mitsuki Koga as Shimotsuki 
Masanori Mimoto as Korigatsu 
Yūichi Satō a Kamina
Kentarō Shimazu as Sick Man

References

External links
  
 

2011 films
2010s Japanese-language films
Ninja films
Sentai Filmworks
2010s Japanese films